The award, sponsored by The Camille and Henry Dreyfus Foundation, was instituted in 1993 with the intention of recognizing "significant accomplishments by individuals who have stimulated or fostered the interest of women in chemistry, promoting their professional development as chemists or chemical engineers." Recipients receive $5,000, a certificate, up to $1,500 for travel expenses, and a grant of $10,000. The deadline for nomination is 1 November every year.

Recipients
Awardees are listed here along with their affiliation at the time of the award.

See also

 List of chemistry awards
List of science and technology awards for women

References

External links 
 
 The Camille and Henry Dreyfus Foundation   Official Website

Awards of the American Chemical Society